(Devanagari ) is a Marathi term which refers to an age-long Indian custom of taking a stroll after a meal. The word is a dvigu compound from  "hundred" and   "step", which literally means "walking 100 steps" after a meal.

Benefits

Experts believe that walking at least 100 steps after eating your dinner / lunch improves your overall wellbeing. This includes proper digestion, burning calories, better control of blood sugar levels and triglycerides in the body.

Here is how a 15-minute walk after meals can transform your health and prevent various health complications.

Aids digestion

The process of digestion is initiated soon after a person has consumed his meals. The gastric juices and enzymes responsible for digestion are stimulated in the meantime. However, if a person walks after eating his dinner, the process of gastric emptying of the meal is accelerated leading to better digestion. This in turn, prevents various stomach complications such as acidity or indigestion that is usually warranted after having meals.

Boosts metabolism

Apart from caloric intake and pattern of eating, leading an active physical life is one of the key reasons to boost metabolism. Hence, people are advised to go for a walk after having their dinner as it stimulates the metabolic process and influences the functioning of other organs in the body.

Induces sleep

The habit of going to bed after having dinner is definitely not good for health. However, a few minutes of walking in the lawn or in your house can do wonders to your health. It not only improves the blood circulation in the body but also relieves stress. This is the reason, why people walking around 100 steps after dinner enjoy a good night's sleep.

Improves blood circulation

A 15-minute walk after eating your dinner not only lowers blood levels of fat (triglycerides and cholesterol) but also enhances blood circulation to various parts of the body. This is mainly due to the fact that walking ensures proper supply of oxygen and nutrients to the heart which in turn causes better blood circulation.

Maintains blood sugar levels

People suffering from type 2 diabetes are benefitted by regularly walking after having their meals. After eating dinner the blood sugar levels spike up due to breakdown of food components. But when you walk after having dinner, the body is physically active which uses the excess glucose present in the blood thereby controlling sugar levels.

Helps in Weight loss

As a 15-minute walk after dinner is a must to lead a healthy life, it plays a key role in weight loss. It is one of the most effective and simple ways to maintain a healthy weight as walking not only burns calories but also improves your overall health.

References
 Colberg SR, Zarrabi L, Bennington L, Nakave A, Thomas Somma C, Swain DP, Sechrist SR. Postprandial walking is better for lowering the glycemic effect of dinner than pre-dinner exercise in type 2 diabetic individuals. J Am Med Dir Assoc. 2009 Jul;10(6):394-7. . Epub 2009 May 21. PubMed . 
 Hijikata Y, Yamada S. Walking just after a meal seems to be more effective for weight loss than waiting for one hour to walk after a meal. International Journal of General Medicine 2011;4:447-450. .
 Franke A, Harder H, Orth AK, Zitzmann S, Singer MV. Postprandial walking but not consumption of alcoholic digestifs or espresso accelerates gastric emptying in healthy volunteers. J Gastrointestin Liver Dis. 2008 Mar;17(1):27-31. PubMed .

Marathi words and phrases
Walking